Commando VIP is a British reality television show that aired on Channel 5 (UK) from 19 October to 23 November 2005. It put six celebrities through tough military-style challenges after being trained by three real commandos. The show was narrated by Ralph Ineson.

Cast 
The celebrities who participated in the show were:

 Nigel Benn (boxer)
 Steve Collins (boxer)
 Jason Cowan (former Big Brother contestant)
 Ryan Dunn (from Jackass)
 Lee Latchford-Evans (former member of Steps)
 Heather Peace (actress)

References

External links
 

2005 British television series debuts
2005 British television series endings
2000s British reality television series
Channel 5 (British TV channel) original programming
English-language television shows